Cross-country skiing has been contested at the Asian Winter Games since the first Winter Games in 1986.

Editions

Events

Medal table

List of medalists

References 

 
Sports at the Asian Winter Games
Asian Winter Games
Nordic skiing at the Asian Winter Games